Alphonse Henriquez (1879 – 20 December 1955) was a Haitian composer. His work was part of the music event in the art competition at the 1932 Summer Olympics.

References

1879 births
1955 deaths
Haitian composers
Olympic competitors in art competitions
Place of birth missing